Crown Prince Rudolph's Last Love (German: Kronprinz Rudolfs letzte Liebe/Mayerling) is a 1955 Austrian historical drama film directed by Rudolf Jugert and starring Rudolf Prack, Christiane Hörbiger and Winnie Markus. The film portrays the tragic 1889 Mayerling Incident, in which Rudolf, Crown Prince of Austria and his lover Baroness Mary Vetsera committed suicide.

The film was shot in Agfacolor, with sets designed by Alexander Sawczynski and Werner Schlichting. It was made at the Rosenhügel Studios in Vienna.

Cast
 Rudolf Prack as Crown Prince Rudolf
 Christiane Hörbiger as Baroness Mary Vetsera
 Winnie Markus as Countess  Larisch
 Lil Dagover as Empress Elisabeth
 Erik Frey as Emperor Franz Joseph
 Adrienne Gessner as 
 Greta Zimmer as Crown Princess Stephanie
 Walter Reyer as Archduke Johann Salvator
 Josef Kahlenberg as Adjutant of the Emperor
 C.W. Fernbach as Adjutant of the Crown Prince
 Eduard Volters as Baltazzi  
 Karl Schwetter as Stockau  
 Gretl Rainer as Agnes  
 Erich Dörner as A Viennese man

References

Bibliography 
 Bock, Hans-Michael & Bergfelder, Tim. The Concise CineGraph. Encyclopedia of German Cinema. Berghahn Books, 2009.

External links 
 

1956 films
1950s historical drama films
Austrian historical drama films
1950s German-language films
Films directed by Rudolf Jugert
Films set in Austria
Films set in 1889
Films about suicide
Constantin Film films
Rudolf, Crown Prince of Austria
Cultural depictions of Empress Elisabeth of Austria
Cultural depictions of Franz Joseph I of Austria
1956 drama films
Films set in Austria-Hungary
Films shot at Rosenhügel Studios